Esmie Calkins (née Lawrence, born 19 November 1961) is a Canadian former sprinter. She won a silver medal in the 4 × 100 metres relay at the 1986 Commonwealth Games, and went on to run in the heats of the women's 4 × 400 metres relay at the 1988 Seoul Olympics.

International competitions

References

External links
 

1961 births
Living people
Jamaican emigrants to Canada
Athletes (track and field) at the 1988 Summer Olympics
Canadian female sprinters
Olympic track and field athletes of Canada
Commonwealth Games silver medallists for Canada
Commonwealth Games medallists in athletics
Athletes (track and field) at the 1986 Commonwealth Games
Athletes (track and field) at the 1990 Commonwealth Games
Place of birth missing (living people)
Universiade medalists in athletics (track and field)
Universiade silver medalists for Canada
Black Canadian female track and field athletes
Olympic female sprinters
Medallists at the 1986 Commonwealth Games